Pranay is a Hindu Indian masculine given name, which means "affection/love" or "regard". 

Notable people with the name include:  
Pranay Chulet, Indian entrepreneur, founder of Quikr
Pranay Gupte, Indian-American journalist, author and newspaper founder
Pranaya SJB Rana, Nepali journalist, author and newspaper editor
Pranay Sahay, Indian police officer
Pranay Sharma, Indian cricketer
Dasyam Pranay Bhasker, Indian politician

References

Indian masculine given names
Hindu given names
Indian given names